Ryazanovka is a rural locality (a settlement) in Baranovsky Selsoviet, Zmeinogorsky District, Altai Krai, Russia. The population was 8 as of 2013. There is 1 street.

Geography 
Ryazanovka is located 18 km southeast of Zmeinogorsk (the district's administrative centre) by road. Baranovka is the nearest rural locality.

References 

Rural localities in Zmeinogorsky District